Václav Boštík (6 November 1913 – 7 May 2005)  was a Czech painter, graphic artist and illustrator.

In 1937 he joined the Academy in Prague and from 1942, he was a member of the Umělecká beseda (Art Forum). In 1960 he became one of the founding members of the UB 12 Group.

His early work is much influenced by painters Corot and Cézanne and realism. However, by the late 1950s, he had begun painting abstract art. Later he participated in the restoration of Renaissance artistic work on the facade of Litomyšl castle.

In 1991 he was awarded the Chevalier de L'Ordre des Arts et des Lettres (Knight of the Order of Arts and Letter) by the French government. Shortly before his death, in 2004 he received an award from the Minister of Culture and in the same year Medal of Merit from the President of the Czech Republic.

His work is on display in Prague City Gallery.

See also
List of Czech painters

References

Czech graphic designers
Czech illustrators
1913 births
2005 deaths
Recipients of Medal of Merit (Czech Republic)
Academy of Fine Arts, Prague alumni
20th-century Czech painters
20th-century Czech male artists
Czech male painters
Chevaliers of the Ordre des Arts et des Lettres